Le Porge is a commune in the Gironde department in Nouvelle-Aquitaine in south-western France.

Population

See also
Communes of the Gironde department

References

External links

Official site

Communes of Gironde